Anthene lemnos, the large ciliate blue or large hairtail, is a butterfly of the family Lycaenidae. It is found in southern Africa.

The wingspan is 27–30 mm for males and 27–31 mm for females. Adults are on wing year-round, with peaks in summer and autumn.

The larvae feed on Erythrococco berberidea and Erythrococco polyandra.

Subspecies
Anthene lemnos lemnos (KwaZulu-Natal to Mozambique and Zimbabwe, Malawi)
Anthene lemnos loa (Strand, 1911) (north-eastern Tanzania and the coast of eastern Kenya)

References

Butterflies described in 1878
Anthene
Butterflies of Africa
Taxa named by William Chapman Hewitson